Ženski košarkaški klub Jedinstvo Bijelo Polje is a Montenegrin women's basketball team from Bijelo Polje, Montenegro.

Honours
National Championships – 3

First А Women's Basketball League of Montenegro:
Winners (3) : 2009, 2010, 2011
Runners-up (2) : 2007, 2008

National Cups – 1

Montenegrin Women's Basketball Cup:
Winners (1) : 2009
Runners-up (2) : 2007, 2008

Notable former coaches
Slađan Ivić
Aleksandar Icić
Nikola Milatović
Aleksandar Čurović
Goran Vojinović
Stojna Vangelovska

Notable former players
Brankica Hadžović
Stanecia Graham
Jasmina Bigović
Alesia Bialevich
Sandra Joksimović
Sanja Knežević
Slavica Jeknić
Melisa Burdžović
Nataša Cvijović

See also
 KK Jedinstvo Bijelo Polje

External links
 Profile on eurobasket.com

Jedinstvo Bijelo Polje